The Canyon Ladies Classic was a golf tournament on the LPGA Tour, played only in 1968.  It was played at the Canyon Country Club in Palm Springs, California. Kathy Whitworth won the event by two strokes over three other golfers.

References

Former LPGA Tour events
Golf in California
1968 establishments in California
1968 disestablishments in California
Palm Springs, California
Women's sports in California